Sharon Grace Creelman (born April 27, 1964, in Windsor, Ontario) is a former field hockey player from Canada. Between 1982 and 1994, Creelman held 139 caps at the Women's Senior National Team.

Creelman captained the national side from 1987 to 1994, and played in three Olympic Games (1984, 1988 and 1992) and in four World Cups (1983, 1986, 1990 and 1994). After her career Creelman became a coach in the sport of field hockey; she was the head coach of Canada's Junior Team in the late 1990s. She then became a physical education teacher at Appleby College located in Oakville, Ontario.

International senior competitions
 1983 – World Cup, Kuala Lumpur (Silver Medal)
 1984 – Olympic Games, Los Angeles (5th)
 1986 – World Cup, Amstelveen (Bronze Medal)
 1987 — Champions Trophy, Amstelveen (4th)
 1987 – Pan Am Games, Indianapolis (Bronze Medal)
 1988 – Olympic Games, Seoul (6th)
 1990 – World Cup, Sydney (10th)
 1991 – Pan Am Games, Havana (Silver Medal)
 1991 – Olympic Qualifier, Auckland (3rd)
 1992 – Olympic Games, Barcelona (7th)
 1993 – World Cup Qualifier, Philadelphia (3rd)
 1994 – World Cup, Dublin (10th)

References

External links
 
 
 
 
 

1964 births
Living people
Canadian female field hockey players
Canadian field hockey coaches
Olympic field hockey players of Canada
Field hockey players at the 1984 Summer Olympics
Field hockey players at the 1988 Summer Olympics
Field hockey players at the 1992 Summer Olympics
Pan American Games medalists in field hockey
Pan American Games silver medalists for Canada
Pan American Games bronze medalists for Canada
Field hockey players at the 1987 Pan American Games
Field hockey players at the 1991 Pan American Games
Canadian people of Ulster-Scottish descent
Field hockey people from Ontario
Sportspeople from Windsor, Ontario
Medalists at the 1987 Pan American Games
Medalists at the 1991 Pan American Games